Tom Moyane (born 31 January 1953) is a South African development economist and former commissioner of the South African Revenue Service (SARS).

Education and exile 
After obtaining a BSc in Economics from the Eduardo Mondlane University in Mozambique, he served as national commissioner of the Department of Correctional Services and chief executive of the Government Printing Works. He had also been an advisor to the State Information Technology Agency. While in exile from South Africa during Apartheid he worked for government departments in Mozambique and Guinea-Bissau.

Career

SARS Commissioner 
Moyane was appointed chief tax collector in September 2014. During his tenure, Moyane had been heavily criticised for his financial management of SARS and his treatment of a controversial investigation that saw the departure of 55 senior staff and managers from the organisation. The 2017 book The President's Keepers claimed that Moyane's predecessor had begged South African President Jacob Zuma to submit tax returns before Zuma appointed Moyane, and described Moyane as a crony of Zuma. SARS rejected the allegations in the book, threatened to sue its author and lay criminal charges on the disclosure of confidential taxpayer information.

These allegations and investigations led to his suspension on 19 March 2018 by South Africa's president Cyril Ramaphosa, who cited a need to "restore the credibility of SARS without delay" after Moyane's leadership compromised the organisational and financial position of SARS. The suspension was enacted after Moyane had refused to step down voluntarily. He was eventually fired on 1 November 2018 by President Cyril Ramaphosa on the recommendation of the SARS commission of inquiry's chair, retired judge Robert Nugent.

After his firing Moyane launched a "marathon" legal battle to get his job back. After the North Gauteng High court on 11 December upheld his dismissal, the Constitutional Court dismissed Moyane's plea on 4 February as well, arguing that it "bears no reasonable prospect for success".

On January 4, 2022, Part 1 of the Zondo Commission Report on state capture was published. The report recommended that Moyane be charged with perjury for lying and providing false information to parliament in relation to his activities at SARS.

References 

Living people
21st-century South African economists
1953 births
20th-century South African economists